Linda Jane O'Neill (born 25 May 1992) is a retired Australian association football player, who last played for Western Sydney Wanderers in the Australian W-League. Her profession outside of football is a registered nurse.

Honours

Club
Sydney FC:
 W-League Premiership: 2009
 W-League Championship: 2009

References

External links
 

1992 births
Living people
Australian women's soccer players
Sydney FC (A-League Women) players
Western Sydney Wanderers FC (A-League Women) players
People from Katoomba, New South Wales
Women's association football midfielders
People from the Blue Mountains (New South Wales)
Sportswomen from New South Wales
Soccer players from New South Wales